The Warden of the Swans is an office in the Royal Household of the Sovereign of the United Kingdom, created in 1993 when the ancient post of Keeper of the Kings Swans (which dated from the 13th century) was divided into two new posts. The second is the Marker of the Swans.

The first office-holder, as so far the only Warden of the Swans, is Professor Christopher Perrins, LVO, appointed 1993.

See also 
 Swan Upping

References

External links 
 Wardens get down to the task of swan-upping

Positions within the British Royal Household
Ceremonial officers in the United Kingdom
Culture associated with the River Thames
Swans